The 2008 Michigan State Spartans football team represented Michigan State University in the 2008 NCAA Division I FBS football season. The team's head coach was Mark Dantonio. The Spartans played their home games at Spartan Stadium in East Lansing, Michigan. This was Dantonio's second season as the Spartans head coach.

Previous season
In the 2007 season, the Spartans opened the season 4–0, but lost five of their next six games to put their record at 5–5. Michigan State ended up finishing the season 7–5 after defeating Purdue and Penn State.This qualified the Spartans into a bowl for the first time since the 2003 season. The Spartans played in the Champs Sports Bowl against ACC opponent Boston College, losing 24–21 to end Dantonio's first season at 7–6.

Schedule
The Spartans opened the 2008 season at California Memorial Stadium against California of the Pac-10.  The game ended the home and home between Michigan State and California. The other game was played in the 2002 season at Spartan Stadium.   Michigan State played their next three games at home against MAC opponent and instate rival Eastern Michigan, Sun Belt opponent Florida Atlantic, and rival Notre Dame.

Following the conclusion of the non-conference portion of their schedule, the Spartans began Big Ten play with an away game against Indiana and opened October with their first Big Ten home game against Iowa. The Spartans then traveled to Evanston, Illinois, to avenge a 2007 overtime loss against Northwestern.  The following week, Michigan State returned to East Lansing to play against 2007 BCS runner-up Ohio State.  Michigan State ended October in Ann Arbor to play in-state rival and nemesis Michigan.  The Spartans opened their final month of the regular season against Wisconsin.  The following week, Michigan State played its final home game of the season against Purdue.  The Spartans had a bye week before traveling to University Park, Pennsylvania to play their final game of the season against Penn State.

Game summaries

California

Both teams were scoreless until a blocked Spartans punt resulted in a Bears touchdown in the first quarter.  Cal scored again on a field goal by freshman kicker David Seawright in the second quarter.  Michigan State responded when Otis Wiley intercepted a Nate Longshore pass and returning it for a touchdown, while Cal was able to counter with a touchdown run by Jahvid Best prior to the half.

The second half saw both teams score back and forth.  The Spartans struck first with a touchdown run by Javon Ringer, followed by Cal QB Kevin Riley connecting with Cameron Morrah for a touchdown.  Ringer made his second touchdown run of the game in the fourth quarter, while Riley made his second touchdown pass of the game to Will Ta'ufo'ou.  After a Spartans field goal, freshman running back Shane Vereen scored on an 81-yard touchdown run that gave the Bears their final score of the game.  The Spartans countered with a touchdown pass from Brian Hoyer to Mark Dell to get within 7 points and had a chance to tie the game with seconds left, but Hoyer threw four straight incompletions from midfield.

Longshore, who lost the starting quarterback job to Riley, threw for 62 yards with 2 interceptions.  Riley threw for 202 yards with 2 touchdowns.  The game marked the first time that two Cal running backs had completed over 100 yards rushing since the 2006 Holiday Bowl, with Best at 111 yards and Vereen at 101, respectively.  Spartans quarterback Hoyer finished with 321 yards passing, including a touchdown and an interception.  Ringer, who completed 1,447 yards rushing during the 2007 season, was held to 81 yards, which included 2 touchdowns.

Eastern Michigan

Florida Atlantic

It was a rainy day in East Lansing. On the second play of the game FAU broke a would-be 79 yd touchdown run, but it was called back on a holding penalty. Because of the horrible weather conditions, the teams combined had 3 lost fumbles, and it was a low-scoring affair. Javon Ringer had a career-high 282 yards and added 2 touchdowns.

Notre Dame

In week four, the Spartans welcomed undefeated rival Notre Dame. In the previous eight years of the rivalry, the visiting team had won each game. Michigan State was able to dominate the ground game on both sides of the ball, rushing for 203 yards while holding Notre Dame to just 16 rushing yards. Javon Ringer, who had over 200 yards rushing on the game, brought out his offensive line, tight ends, and fullbacks to the post-game press conference to recognize them for their contributions.

Indiana

The Spartans and the Hoosiers met for the Old Brass Spitoon. This game featured a great deal of offense. Spartans QB Brian Hoyer finally had a break out game. It had all been Javon Ringer up until this point. In one of the most exciting plays of the game, Hoyer hit TE Charlie Gantt on an 83 yd TD pass. But the Hoosiers came back with an 80 yd TD run by Marcus Thigpen, who tore up the defense. It was 27–22 at halftime. The defense stepped up in the second half for the Spartans, allowing only one touchdown. In one of the crucial plays of the game, a 99 yd TD pass was called back on a holding penalty. The Hoosiers were on their own goal line, and the holding penalty caused a safety. That sucked the momentum out the Hoosiers as the Spartans went on to win 42–29. Brian Hoyer was 14–26, threw for 261 yds, and 2 TD's, while Javon Ringer improved his Heisman resume, rushing for 198 yds, and 2 TD's. The Spartans improved to a 4–1 record.

Iowa

Michigan State got out to an early 13–0 lead behind two Brett Swenson field goals and a touchdown pass to Charlie Gantt. However, Iowa stormed back in the second half, with running back Shonn Greene running for 157 yards on the day. It took a late stop by Adam Decker on an Iowa fourth-and-one at the MSU 21-yard line to seal the victory for Michigan State. Iowa went on to win 6 of its final 7 games including a win in the Outback Bowl.

Northwestern

Ohio State

Michigan

The Spartans struck first, scoring on a huge 61 yard TD pass from Brian Hoyer to Blair White with just under 12 minutes to go in the first quarter. The Wolverines tied it up near the end of the first quarter when Brandon Minor scored on a 19-yard TD pass from Steven Threet (this score was the result of an incorrectly overturned call from the initial ruling of an incomplete pass). The Spartans took the lead back near the end of the half with a 64-yard TD run by Javon Ringer. The Wolverines tied it back up less than a minute later when Brandon Minor ran in a TD from 2 yards out. Midway through the third quarter, the Wolverines took their only lead of the game when QB Steven Threet ran in a touchdown himself from 2 yards out. However, the Spartans entirely controlled the game after that. The Spartans tied it back up when Charlie Gantt scored on a 4-yard TD pass near the end of the third quarter. The Wolverines were shut out in the fourth quarter. The Spartans took the lead for good in the fourth quarter when Javon Ringer ran in another TD, this time from 3 yards out, and capped their win when Josh Rouse scored on a 7-yard TD pass.

Wisconsin

Coming off of an emotional win against arch-rival Michigan, Michigan State appeared to suffer a bit of an emotional letdown against the underachieving Badgers. Wisconsin dominated the ground game on both sides of the ball, rushing for 281 yards while holding Michigan State to just 25 yards rushing. With Wisconsin leading 24–22 late in the fourth quarter with the ball in Spartan territory, the game appeared all but over. However, a holding call brought back what would have likely been the game-clinching first down for Wisconsin and forced them to punt. With 1:19 left to play, Brian Hoyer led a drive to set up the game-winning 44 yard field goal by Brett Swenson with 7 seconds remaining.

Purdue

Penn State

Coming into the game, Michigan State had a chance to clinch a share of their first Big Ten title since 1990. However, Penn State held Javon Ringer to 42 yards on 17 carries as the Lions beat Michigan state 49–18. Daryll Clark threw for 341 yards and 4 touchdown passes.

Capital One Bowl

Personnel

2009 NFL Draft
Only one Spartan was selected in the 2009 NFL Draft. However, quarterback Brian Hoyer signed with the New England Patriots as an undrafted free agent.

References

Michigan State
Michigan State Spartans football seasons
Michigan State Spartans football